Ampleforth railway station, served the village of Ampleforth, in the Northern English county of North Yorkshire. It was located on a line which ran from Pickering to the East Coast Main Line at Thirsk.
The station was close to the noted Ampleforth College although passengers for the college used the station at  further east as this was more convenient for onward transfer to the college.

History
Opened by the York, Newcastle and Berwick Railway in May 1853, then absorbed by the North Eastern Railway the station joined the London and North Eastern Railway during the Grouping of 1923. The station passed to the Eastern Region of British Railways on nationalisation in 1948.

Ampleforth station was quite small as it was some  distant from Ampleforth village and most passengers and traffic for the college alighted at, or were loaded at, Gilling station further east, which was also the terminus for the Ampleforth College Tramway. The station consisted of one running line with one platform and a small goods yard which forwarded mostly livestock and potatoes with coal being the most common inward commodity.

On 30 December 1865, a Gilling to  passenger train was running non-stop through the station when it was routed off the running line and onto the station siding. At the time, some builders were loading roof tiles onto their truck and one of them was killed. It was later determined that the points were set incorrectly for the siding and as the engine was running tender first, the driver's sight of the track ahead was hindered.

The station was closed by the British Transport Commission in June 1950, three years before the rest of the stations on the line were closed down.

References

External links
 Station on navigable O.S. map.

Disused railway stations in North Yorkshire
Former North Eastern Railway (UK) stations
Railway stations in Great Britain opened in 1853
Railway stations in Great Britain closed in 1950